Vinogradovia is a genus of flowering plants belonging to the family Apiaceae.

Its native range is Turkey.

Species:
 Vinogradovia conferta (Hub.-Mor. & Lamond) Bani, D.A.German & M.A.Koch

References

Apiaceae
Apiaceae genera